Major (Francis) Nigel Napier, 14th Lord Napier, 5th Baron Ettrick  (5 December 1930 – 15 March 2012) was a Scottish soldier and courtier. He was the son of Lt.-Colonel William Francis Cyril James Hamilton Napier, 13th Lord Napier, 4th Baron Ettrick and Violet Muir Newson, daughter of Sir Percy Wilson Newson, 1st Bt.

Lord Napier was the hereditary Clan Chief of Clan Napier.

Educated at Eton and Sandhurst he was commissioned into the Scots Guards serving in Malaya in 1950. At the death of his father in 1954 he succeeded as 14th Lord Napier, 5th Lord Ettrick, and 11th baronet of Nova Scotia, as well as chief of the name and arms of Clan Napier. After retiring from the army he became an equerry to the Duke of Gloucester (1958–60) then became Comptroller and Private Secretary to Princess Margaret (1973–98) and Treasurer until her death in 2002.

Lord Napier married Delia Mary Pearson and they had four children:

Hon. Louisa Mary Constance Napier (born 1961)
Francis David Charles Napier, 15th Lord Napier and 6th Lord Ettrick (born 1962)
Hon. Georgina Helena Katherine Napier (born 1969)
Hon. Nicholas Alexander John Napier (born 1971)

Sources 

 ThePeerage.com

|-

1930 births
2012 deaths
People educated at Eton College
Barons in the Peerage of the United Kingdom
Nigel
Scots Guards officers
Equerries
Deputy Lieutenants of Selkirkshire
Knights Commander of the Royal Victorian Order
Graduates of the Royal Military Academy Sandhurst
British Army personnel of the Malayan Emergency
Lords Napier
Eldest sons of British hereditary barons
Napier